Ugly Creek is a stream in the U.S. state of Georgia. It is a tributary to Alligator Creek.

The name "Ugly Creek" most likely was humorously applied by a surveyor.

References

Rivers of Georgia (U.S. state)
Rivers of Twiggs County, Georgia